Year 1011 (MXI) was a common year starting on Monday of the Julian Calendar.

Events 
 By place 

 Europe 

 June 11 – Lombard Revolt: Mahmoud the Fat of Bari rises up against the Lombard rebels, led by Melus, and delivers the city to Basil Mesardonites, Byzantine governor (catepan) of the Catepanate of Italy. Melus is forced to flee to Salerno, and his brother-in-law Dattus escapes to Monte Cassino, but their families are taken captive, and carted off to Constantinople. 
 Autumn – Basil Mesardonites visits Guaimar III of Salerno to secure his cooperation. Melus is forced to flee again. Basil proceeds to Monte Cassino – and persuades Abbot Atenulf to expel Dattus. Pope Sergius IV support Dattus with papal troops to garrison the tower on the Garigliano River, a fortified complex in the territory of the Duchy of Gaeta.
 King Henry II enfeoffs Adalbero with Carinthia (including the rule over the March of Verona) after the death of Duke Conrad I
 The Grand Prince of Kyiv and ruler of Kievan Rus' Vladimir the Great laid the first foundations of Saint Sophia Cathedral, Kyiv.

 England 

 September 29 – Siege of Canterbury: Danish Viking raiders led by Thorkell the Tall pillage Canterbury after a siege, taking Ælfheah, archbishop of Canterbury, as a prisoner.
 Byrhtferth, Benedictine monk of Ramsey Abbey, writes his Manual (Enchiridion) on the divine order of the universe and time.

 Middle East 

 Ibn al-Haytham (Alhazen), an Arab scientist working in Egypt, feigns madness for fear of angering Caliph Al-Hakim bi-Amr Allah, and is kept under house arrest. During this time he begins writing his influential Book of Optics.
 Baghdad Manifesto is ordered by Caliph Al-Qadir of the Abbasid Caliphate in response to the growth of the Fatimid-supporting Ismaili sect of Islam within his borders.

 Asia 

 Emperor Ichijō abdicates the throne and dies later after a 25-year reign. He is succeeded by his cousin Sanjō as the 67th emperor of Japan.

Births 
 Jōjin, Japanese Tendai monk (d. 1081)
 Ralph the Staller, English nobleman (d. 1068)
 Robert I (the Old), duke of Burgundy (d. 1076)
 Shao Yong, Chinese philosopher and cosmologist (d. 1077)
 Yaghi Siyan, Seljuk governor of Antioch (d. 1098)

Deaths 
 February 9 – Bernard I, German nobleman
 February 23 – Willigis, archbishop of Mainz
 July 25 – Ichijō, emperor of Japan (b. 980)
 November 5 – Mathilde, German abbess (b. 949)
 November 21 – Reizei, emperor of Japan (b. 950)
 Abu Ali Hasan ibn Ustadh-Hurmuz, Buyid general
 Albert I, count of Namur (approximate date)
 Anna Porphyrogenita, Grand Princess of Kiev
 Boniface, Italian nobleman (approximate date)
 Conrad I, duke of Carinthia (approximate date)
 Mahendradatta, queen of Bali (b. 961)
 Muhammad ibn Suri, Ghurid ruler (malik)
 Sumbat III, Georgian prince of Tao-Klarjeti
 Uma no Naishi, Japanese waka poet (b. 949)

References

Sources